Plantago weldenii is a species of annual herb in the family Plantaginaceae. They have a self-supporting growth form. Individuals can grow to 3.2 cm.

Sources

References 

weldenii
Flora of Malta